Stupin is a Russian male surname, its feminine counterpart is Stupina. It may refer to
Alexander Stupin (1776–1861), Russian painter and art teacher
Paul Stupin, American film and television executive
Rafael Stupin (1798-1860s), Russian painter
Sergei Stupin (born 1979), Russian ice hockey defenceman